Co-op Place (formerly Canalta Centre) is a 7,100-seat indoor arena located in Medicine Hat, Alberta, Canada. It opened on August 22, 2015 as the new home of the Medicine Hat Tigers of the Western Hockey League, replacing the Medicine Hat Arena.

History 
The arena was initially operated by SMG (now ASM Global) under a contract with the city. The arena underperformed in its first years of operations, failed to attract as many major events as Medicine Hat Arena, and its operating costs were higher than expected. In April 2020, the city announced that it would not renew its contract with ASM Global, and that operations for the arena would be brought in-house.

Canalta Hotels initially held the naming rights to the arena. In 2020, South Country Co-op acquired the naming rights, renaming the arena Co-op Place.

References

External links
 

Indoor arenas in Alberta
Indoor ice hockey venues in Canada
Western Hockey League arenas
Sport in Medicine Hat